NGC 6426 is a globular cluster located in the constellation Ophiuchus. It is designated IX in the galaxy morphological classification scheme and was discovered by the British astronomer William Herschel on 3 June 1786. It is at a distance of 67,500 light years away from Earth.

See also 
 List of NGC objects (6001–7000)
 List of NGC objects

References

External links 
 

Ophiuchus (constellation)
6426
Globular clusters